The 2019 South American Cricket Championship was a cricket tournament took place in Lima, Peru from 3 to 6 October 2019. This was the sixteenth edition of the men's South American Cricket Championship, and the first in which matches were eligible for T20I status, since the ICC granted Twenty20 International (T20I) status to matches between all of its Members. Mexico were the defending champions having won the event in 2018.

The seven participating teams were the national sides of hosts Peru, along with Argentina, Brazil, Chile, Colombia, Mexico and Uruguay. Colombia and Uruguay were not Associate Members of the ICC and so matches involving either of these teams did not have T20I status.

Argentina defeated Mexico by four wickets in the final.

Squads

Round-robin

Points table

Matches

Final

See also
 2019 South American Cricket Championship – Women's tournament

References

External links
 Series home at ESPN Cricinfo

Associate international cricket competitions in 2019–20
International cricket competitions in Peru
Men's South American Cricket Championship